The 2000 Cherwell District Council election took place on 4 May 2000 to elect members of Cherwell District Council in Oxfordshire, England. One third of the council was up for election and the Conservative Party gained overall control of the council from no overall control.

The results saw the Conservatives gain 7 seats, 6 of them from the Labour Party, to win a majority on the council for the first time since 1995. Conservative gains came mainly in the Banbury and Bicester areas, with the biggest name Labour councillor to lose in the election being the former mayor, John Hanna. One of the Conservative winners in the election was Mary Young, who won in South East Kidlington ward to become a councillor for the first time at the age of 81. Turnout in the election varied from a high of 53% in Ruscote to a low of 11% in Neithrop.

After the election, the composition of the council was:
Conservative 33
Labour 13
Liberal Democrat 4
Independent 2

Election result

Ward results

References

2000 English local elections
2000
2000s in Oxfordshire